Metriochroa psychotriella is a moth of the family Gracillariidae. It is known from Florida, United States.

The larvae feed on Psychotria nervosa and Psychotria undata. They mine the leaves of their host plant.

References

Phyllocnistinae